Card Factory is a retailer of greeting cards and gifts in the United Kingdom founded in Wakefield by Dean Hoyle and his wife Janet. The first store opened in 1997, and by 2020 the company had over 1,000 stores. The company also operates two retail websites and has mobile apps for both iPhone and Android. It is listed on the London Stock Exchange.

History

Origins to 2009
Dean Hoyle left school with no qualifications, having a self confessed greater interest in football. With his wife Janet, from 1993 they began buying cards wholesale, and selling them from the back of their van at car boot sales and public open air events.

In 1997, they opened their first shop under within the holding company Sportswift Ltd, purposefully choosing secondary retail locations which were cheaper. After opening a few stores, whilst Janet founded and headed up the internal design and print function, Dean concentrated on expanding the business, with a nominal target of 500 retail outlets. This gave the company a profit margin advantage over rivals, including Clinton Cards.

The couple built a board to expand the business, including: Keith Pacey (chairman of Maplin); Richard Hayes (managing director, their ex bank manager); Chris Beck (commercial director, ex Grant Thornton); Darren Bryant (group finance director, ex PricewaterhouseCoopers). On 28 November 2008, Card Factory purchased about 80 of the 288 stores from failed greetings card company Celebrations Group (which traded as Card Warehouse and Cardfair), as part of a rescue package, securing around 500 of the 1,800 jobs at Celebrations.

2010s
The couple put the business up for sale in January 2010 and on 8 April 2010, Charterhouse completed the £350 million purchase of the company which at the time operated 480 stores. This enabled Dean Hoyle to later buy Huddersfield Town F.C.

On 14 July 2011, Card Factory purchased gettingpersonal.co.uk, an online retailer of personalised gifts, for an undisclosed sum.

In May 2014, the company floated via an initial public offering on the London Stock Exchange.

In April 2015, the company launched its own website, cardfactory.co.uk.

In 2019, the company began supplying cards to Aldi, Matalan and The Reject Shop.

2020s

Card Factory shops were shut for much of 2020 and the beginning of 2021 due to the COVID-19 pandemic. Revenue from the website more than doubled during this period, and the website was relaunched in August 2020 to enable cards to be personalised, matching similar offerings to Moonpig and Funky Pigeon. In late 2020, the company launched mobile apps for both iPhone and Android devices.
In December 2020, Costcutter boss Darcy Willson-Rymer was appointed as chief executive.

Operations
The company operates some 1,000 stores. Macmillan Cancer Support is the company's chosen charity; Card Factory donations to the charity had totalled £1 million by 2008 and £3 million by 2014.

Controversy
The company has been successfully prosecuted for Health and Safety infringements on a number of occasions. Incidents have included poor stock management,
overstocking of stores,
damaged equipment, inadequate risk assessments and staff training.

References

External links

 Card Factory website
 Getting Personal website

Greeting cards
British brands
Retail companies of the United Kingdom
Retail companies established in 1997
Companies based in Wakefield
2014 initial public offerings
Companies listed on the London Stock Exchange
1997 establishments in the United Kingdom
Companies established in 1997